Lucas Lourenço Andrade (born 23 January 2001), is a Brazilian footballer who plays as an attacking midfielder for Botafogo-SP, on loan from Santos.

Club career
Born in Santos, São Paulo, Lucas Lourenço joined Santos' youth setup in 2013, after playing for the club's futsal team. On 2 October 2017, he signed his first professional contract with the club, lasting until September 2022.

In January 2018, Lucas Lourenço was promoted to the main squad by new manager Jair Ventura, but was demoted back to the under-17s in the following month. He subsequently moved to the under-20 squad before returning to the first team under new manager Cuca.

Lucas Lourenço made his first team – and Série A – debut on 2 December 2018, coming on as a second-half substitute for Jean Mota in a 2–1 away loss against Sport. On 1 September 2020, despite only featuring for the under-20s, he renewed his contract until December 2024.

On 15 September 2020, Lucas Lourenço made his Copa Libertadores debut by replacing fellow youth graduate Alison in a 0–0 home draw against Club Olimpia. On 20 July of the following year, he moved to Série B side Londrina on loan until the end of the season.

In September 2021, after missing trainings, Lucas Lourenço's loan was cut short and he returned to Santos. On 14 December, he was loaned to Santo André for the 2022 Campeonato Paulista.

On 6 July 2022, Lucas Lourenço was loaned to CSA for the remainder of the 2022 Série B. On 18 November, he moved to fellow league team Botafogo-SP also in a temporary deal.

International career
Lucas Lourenço was called up to Brazil under-17s for the 2017 Montaigu Tournament.

Career statistics

References

External links
Santos FC profile 

2001 births
Living people
Sportspeople from Santos, São Paulo
Brazilian footballers
Association football midfielders
Campeonato Brasileiro Série A players
Campeonato Brasileiro Série B players
Santos FC players
Londrina Esporte Clube players
Esporte Clube Santo André players
Centro Sportivo Alagoano players
Botafogo Futebol Clube (SP) players
Brazil youth international footballers